The 22nd Mieczysław Połukard Criterium of Polish Speedway League Aces was the 2003 version of the Mieczysław Połukard Criterium of Polish Speedway Leagues Aces. It took place on March 28 in the Polonia Stadium in Bydgoszcz, Poland.

Starting positions draw 

 Jacek Gollob - Plusssz-Polonia Bydgoszcz
 Tomasz Bajerski - Apator-Adriana Toruń
 Mirosław Kowalik - Plusssz-Polonia Bydgoszcz
 Piotr Świst - ZKŻ Quick-Mix Zielona Góra
 Tomasz Gollob - Plusssz-Polonia Bydgoszcz
 Wiesław Jaguś - Apator-Adriana Toruń
 Robert Sawina - Apator-Adriana Toruń
 Michał Robacki - Plusssz-Polonia Bydgoszcz
 Rafał Okoniewski - ZKŻ Quick-Mix Zielona Góra
 Rune Holta - Top Secret-Włókniarz Częstochowa
 Jacek Krzyżaniak - Plusssz-Polonia Bydgoszcz
 Krzysztof Kasprzak - Unia Leszno
 Rafał Dobrucki - Unia Leszno
 Tomasz Jędrzejak - Atlas Wrocław
 Rafał Kurmański - ZKŻ Quick-Mix Zielona Góra
 Krzysztof Cegielski - Atlas Wrocław
 (R1) Grzegorz Czechowski - Plusssz-Polonia Bydgoszcz
 (R2) Łukasz Stanisławski - Plusssz-Polonia Bydgoszcz

Heat details

Sources 
 Roman Lach - Polish Speedway Almanac

See also 

Criterium of Aces
20030